Hilde Krüger (9 November 1912 – 8 May 1991) was a German film actress who eventually settled in Mexico.

Life
Krüger was born in 1912. One source says she was born in Cologne while another claims her birth occurred in Berlin on September 11, 1914. Her dramatic success was assigned to the patronage of Joseph Goebbels, which happened after she appeared in the anti-Semitic film Don't Lose Heart, Suzanne!  She appeared in twenty more films.

She is suspected of working as a spy for the Abwehr, the German intelligence department during the Second World War, cultivating leading figures in Mexican society. She had intended to settle in Hollywood, but she struggled to find work and had to leave for Mexico.

She died in 1991 on a visit to Germany; the death certificate lists her residence as an apartment in New York City.

Selected filmography
 Playing with Fire (1934)
 She and the Three (1935)
 Stradivari (1935)
Peter, Paul and Nanette (1935)
 Don't Lose Heart, Suzanne! (1935)
 Incognito (1936)
 The Man Who Couldn't Say No (1938)
 He Who Died of Love (1945)
 Adultery (1945)

References

Bibliography
 Kenneth Schuyler Lynn. Charlie Chaplin and His Times. Simon and Schuster, 1997.

External links

1912 births
1991 deaths
German film actresses
German emigrants to Mexico